Adam Horovitz may refer to:

Ad-Rock (born 1966), stage name of Adam Horovitz of the Beastie Boys
Adam Horovitz (poet) (born 1971), British poet

See also
Adam Horowitz, screenwriter and producer
Adam Horowitz (journalist), co-editor of Mondoweiss
Horovitz (surname)